Nicanor (Nīkā́nōr) was a Syrian Greek who lived in the 3rd century BC under Seleucid Empire.

Together with a Gaul named Apaturius, he assassinated Seleucus III Ceraunus during his expedition into Asia against Attalus I in 222 BC. He was immediately seized and executed by order of the general Achaeus.

(Polybius 4.48; Eusebius Armenian text 165.)

References
 

Ancient Syria
222 BC deaths
Year of birth unknown
3rd-century BC Greek people